Guanajibo may refer to:

Places
Guanajibo, Cabo Rojo, Puerto Rico, a barrio
Guanajibo, Hormigueros, Puerto Rico, a barrio
Guanajibo, Mayagüez, Puerto Rico, a barrio